Nadine Strossen (born August 18, 1950) is an American civil liberties activist who was president of the American Civil Liberties Union (ACLU) from February 1991 to October 2008. A liberal feminist, she was the first woman to ever lead the ACLU. A professor at New York Law School, Strossen is a member of the Council on Foreign Relations and other professional organizations.

Early life 
Strossen was born in Jersey City, New Jersey. Her maternal grandfather was an immigrant from Yugoslavia who held Marxist views. Her father was born in Germany and defined as a half-Jew by Hitler's racial laws because his mother was Jewish, although he was raised Lutheran. She has stated that the experiences of her family were her inspiration to pursue a career in civil liberties. "My father was a Holocaust survivor and my mother's father was a protester during World War I when he came to this country as an immigrant, and he was literally spat upon for not going to fight in the war", said Strossen in an interview. "His official sentence for being a conscientious objector was to be forced to stand against the courthouse in Hudson County, New Jersey so that passers-by could spit on him." Strossen received her B.A. degree from Harvard College in 1972 Phi Beta Kappa, and her J.D. degree from Harvard Law School in 1975, magna cum laude. In law school, she served as an editor of the Harvard Law Review.

Career 
Strossen practiced law in Minneapolis and New York City for nine years before becoming a professor of law at New York Law School in 1988 serving until 2019.

Strossen helped to create, and co-taught, the first stand-alone course dedicated to exploring the human rights responsibilities of global business at Columbia Business School in the early 1990s.

In February 1991, Strossen became the president of the American Civil Liberties Union, filling the vacancy left by the resignation of Norman Dorsen. As president, Strossen made over 200 public presentations. In May 2008, she announced her resignation. On October 18, 2008, the ACLU selected Susan Herman, a constitutional law professor at Brooklyn Law School in New York, to replace her.

She is also a founding member of Feminists for Free Expression.

She appeared in the 2000 docudrama Dirty Pictures. In October 2001, Strossen made her theater debut as the guest star in Eve Ensler's play, The Vagina Monologues at the National Theatre in Washington, D.C.

Having been appointed as the chaired John Marshall Harlan II Professor of Law in 2015, she has been educating students in Constitutional Law and Human Rights.

In 2019, her book, "Hate: Why We Should Resist It with Free Speech, Not Censorship", was chosen as the Washington University in St. Louis Common Reading book. On August 26, Strossen delivered a keynote address at the university.

Other activities 

 Academic Freedom Alliance (AFA), founding member
 University of Austin (UATX), founding member

Personal life 
Strossen is married to Eli Noam, a professor at Columbia University's Graduate School of Business.

Select publications 
 1995: Defending Pornography: Free Speech, Sex and the Fight for Women's Rights
 1996: Speaking of Race, Speaking of Sex: Hate Speech, Civil Rights, and Civil Liberties
 2018: Hate: Why We Should Resist It with Free Speech, Not Censorship

References

External links 

 Profile, New York Law School
 
 
 Nadine Strossen Papers at the Seeley G. Mudd Manuscript Library, Princeton University
 
 

1950 births
Living people
American feminist writers
American legal scholars
American people of German-Jewish descent
American women lawyers
Free speech activists
Harvard College alumni
Harvard Law School alumni
Liberal feminism
Presidents of the American Civil Liberties Union
American women legal scholars
Writers from Jersey City, New Jersey